HMS Druid was one of 20 Acheron-class destroyers built for the Royal Navy during the 1910s. Completed in 1912 the ship served during World War I and was sold for scrap in 1921.

Design and description
The Acheron class was a repeat of the preceding . The Admiralty provided general specifications, but each shipyard did their own detailed design so that ships often varied in size. The ships displaced  at deep load and their crew numbered 70 officers and ratings.

The destroyers were powered by a single Parsons steam turbine that drove three propeller shafts using steam provided by three Yarrow boilers.

The primary armament of the ships consisted of a pair of BL  Mk VIII guns in single, unprotected pivot mounts fore and aft of the superstructure. They were also armed with two single QF 12-pounder guns, one on each broadside abreast the bridge. The destroyers were equipped with a pair of single rotating mounts for 21-inch (533 mm) torpedo tubes amidships and carried two reload torpedoes.

Construction and career
Druid, the sixth ship in the Royal Navy of that name, was ordered under the 1910–1911 Naval Programme from William Denny & Brothers. The ship was laid down at the company's Dumbarton shipyard on 8 November 1910, launched on 4 December 1911 and commissioned in April 1912.

Battle of Heligoland Bight
She was present with the First Destroyer Flotilla on 28 August 1914 at the Battle of Heligoland Bight, led by the scout cruiser Fearless. Druid suffered one man wounded during the action and shared in the prize money for the engagement.

Battle of Dogger Bank
On 24 January 1915 the First Destroyer Flotilla, including Druid, were present at the Battle of Dogger Bank, led by the light cruiser Aurora. Her battle ensign from the engagement is preserved at the Ceiriog Memorial Institute in Wales.  Her crew shared in the prize money for the German armoured cruiser Blücher.

From 1917 the Third Battle Squadron was deployed to the Mediterranean. Druid was present at the entry of the Allied fleet through the Dardanelles on 12 November 1918.

In common with most of her class, she was laid up after World War I, and on 9 May 1921 she was sold to Thos. W. Ward of Briton Ferry for breaking.

Pennant numbers

References

External links
 

 

Acheron-class destroyers of the Royal Navy
Ships built on the River Clyde
1911 ships
World War I destroyers of the United Kingdom